Pierre Campmas,  of Revel, assisted Pierre-Paul Riquet in his earliest design of the Canal du Midi. He helped Riquet confirm that the valleys of the Montagne Noire could provide sufficient water for the canal and helped Riquet build model canal workings at Riquet's estate, Bonrepos.

References

Canal du Midi